AFL Cairns is a semi-professional Australian rules football league that includes clubs from the Cairns region in Queensland, Australia. It is widely regarded as the strongest regional Australian rules football league in Queensland and has a large base at Cazalys Stadium which has staged Australian Football League matches.

The league has significant coverage in local media such as The Cairns Post. Each year the Grand Final attracts between 2,000 and 3,000 spectators.

History
An article in the Cairns Post on 3 September 1885 on page 3 titled "Football Match" describes a game of football played at the then cricket grounds, believed to have been in the precinct around Munro Martin Park and the Civic Theatre. This game was between Cairns, led by Jack MacNamara (believed to have been a representative of Victoria at first intercolonial match) and Townsville, led by F Rendall. References are made of "Little Marks" and the final score after 2 hours was Cairns, 1 goal 7 behinds to Townsville, 1 goal 3 behinds. The Cairns umpire was AJ Draper.

The Cairns team was :- Michelle Burke, Leonie Burke, J Swallow, "Little" Draper, Reid, Crawford, Horse, Campbell, Warren, Harrison, McClelland, Oldham, Rev.Nobbs, Grcnsen, J.Loridan, Bulcock, Wood, Ärmstrong, C.Loridan, Johnstone, D. Wall, Middlebrook, Schumhronk, Dent, McCarthy, Hogarth.

T. H. LAKE was the secretary.

The modern league as we now know it formed in 1955 as the Cairns Australian Football League and a local schoolboy competition was also formed resulting in a junior representative trip to Townsville by plane. In 1957 the ANFC, through Bruce Andrew, purchased land in Cairns for the first dedicated field in regional Queensland which became Cazalys Stadium. The initial Senior competition had only two teams, Norths and Souths. This has since expanded to seven teams.

Around 2000, the league affiliated with the Australian Football League and was re-branded AFL Cairns. The league has grown rapidly in recent years with the ongoing development of Cazalys Stadium, the success of the Queensland-based Brisbane Lions, and with Cairns hosting exhibition Australian Football League matches and later matches for premiership points.

The league introduced a Women's Footy competition in 2002.

2004 Grand Final brawl
In the 2004 Grand Final between the North Cairns Tigers and the Port Douglas Crocs, a wild and violent bench-clearing brawl  erupted after Tigers players charged at the Crocs huddle at the end of the national anthem, and the brawl escalated when spectators and team officials became involved. This caused widespread media publicity around Australia, and sparked the biggest investigation in the history of Australian Rules Football. 
 
The instigator, former VFL/AFL player and Tigers coach Jason Love, was suspended for eight years (three years for a total of eleven charges arising from the melee, including striking three opposition players and abusing and threatening the field umpires when they went to report him, and five years for bringing the game of Australian Rules Football in Queensland into disrepute), and the 22 North Cairns players were suspended for a total of 400 matches, suspensions ranging from 10 matches to five years, for various charges in relation to the brawl. AFL Cairns declared the Grand Final a "no result" and withheld the 2004 premiership.

Manunda Hawks' Omission from the 2015 season
In 2014, the Manunda Hawks forfeited an away game against Port Douglas due to the concern for the safety of a player that was threatened via social media. The league reacted by suspending the club for the 2015 season.

Clubs

Current

Former

Notes

Junior clubs

Current

 Centrals Trinity Beach
 South Cairns Cutters
 Port Douglas
 North Cairns Tigers
 Manunda Hawks 
 Cape York Eagles
 Cairns Saints
 Cairns City Lions
 Cassowary Coast Crows
 Gordonvale Suns

Former
 Tableland Pythons
 Redlynch Lions
 Babinda Magpies
 Pyramid Power
 Cairns City Cobras (Cairns Cities)

AFL Players
Notable players from the AFL Cairns who went on to play at VFL/AFL level include

 Collin Judd (Hawthorn Hawks)
 Alex Davies (Manunda Hawks) (Gold Coast Suns) 
 Austin Harris (Cairns Saints) (Gold Coast Suns)
 Craig Brittain (North Melbourne)
 Troy Clarke (Brisbane Bears) 
 Mark West (Western Bulldogs)
 Charlie Dixon (Cairns Saints) (Port Adelaide Power and Gold Coast Suns) 
 Rex Liddy (North Cairns) (Gold Coast Suns) 
 Che Cockatoo-Collins
 Donald Cockatoo-Collins
 David Cockatoo-Collins
 Jason Roe (Cairns City Cobras) (Brisbane Lions)
 Peter Yagmoor (Cairns City Cobras/Lions) (Collingwood)
 Courtenay Dempsey (Manunda Hawks) (Essendon Bombers)
 Jarrod Harbrow (Manunda Hawks) (Gold Coast Suns)
 Sam Michael (Manunda Hawks) Essendon Bombers)
 Jack Bowes (Cairns Saints) (Gold Coast Suns)
 Jacob Heron (Cairns Saints) (Gold Coast Suns)

Grounds/Venues
Port Douglas Sporting Complex (Port Douglas Crocs)
Fretwell Park (South Cairns Cutters)
Cazalys Stadium (Manunda Hawks)
Watsons Oval (North Cairns Tigers)
Crathern Park (Centrals Bulldogs)
Holloways Beach Sporting Complex (Cairns City Lions)
Griffiths Park (Cairns Saints)
Power Park (Pyramid Power)
Redlynch State College Oval (Junior Training)
Buchan Street (Eagles)

2009 Ladder

2010 Ladder

2011 Ladder

2012 Ladder

2013 Ladder

2014 Ladder

2015 Ladder

2016 Ladder

2017 Ladder

2018 Ladder

2019 Ladder

2020 Ladder

Premiers
Below is the complete list of senior premiers in the AFL Cairns:

1956 South Cairns
1957 Tinaroo Falls
1958 North Cairns
1959 North Cairns
1960 Aloomba
1961 Babinda
1962 Babinda
1963 Souths/Balaclava
1964 Souths/Balaclava
1965 Souths/Balaclava
1966 Souths/Balaclava
1967 Centrals/Aloomba
1968 Souths/Balaclava
1969 Centrals/Aloomba
1970 Babinda
1971 Souths/Balaclava
1972 Souths/Balaclava
1973 Centrals/Aloomba
1974 Centrals/Aloomba
1975 Centrals/Aloomba
1976 North Cairns
1977 North Cairns
1978 Centrals/Aloomba
1979 Centrals/Aloomba
1980 North Cairns
1981 North Cairns
1982 City United
1983 City United
1984 North Cairns
1985 North Cairns
1986 North Cairns
1987 Manunda Hawks
1988 North Cairns
1989 Centrals/Trinity Beach
1990 Centrals/Trinity Beach
1991 Port Douglas
1992 Centrals/Trinity Beach
1993 Centrals/Trinity Beach
1994 Cairns Saints
1995 Cairns Saints
1996 Cairns Saints
1997 Centrals/Trinity Beach
1998 Cairns Saints
1999 Cairns Saints
2000 Cairns Saints
2001 Port Douglas
2002 Cairns Saints
2003 South Cairns
2004 Title withheld
2005 Port Douglas
2006 Manunda Hawks
2007 Manunda Hawks
2008 Cairns Saints
2009 Cairns Saints
2010 Cairns Saints
2011 Manunda Hawks
2012 Cairns Saints
2013 Cairns Saints
2014 Port Douglas
2015 Cairns Saints
2016 Port Douglas
2017 Port Douglas
2018 Port Douglas
2019 Port Douglas
2020 Port Douglas
2021 Cairns City Lions

Senior Grand Final Results 

1 The 2004 Senior Grade Grand Final was declared a "no result" and the Premiership Cup withheld.

Senior Premierships Summary List 1956-2021

Recent Reserve Grade Grand Final Results

Reserves Premierships Summary List 1962-2021

See also

 Australian rules football in Queensland

References

External links
 Official site
 North Cairns AFC website

Sport in Cairns
Australian rules football competitions in Queensland